Ivashchenko is a rural locality (a selo) and the administrative center of Ivashchenkovskoye Rural Settlement, Alexeyevsky District, Belgorod Oblast, Russia. The population was 352 as of 2010. There are six streets.

Geography 
Ivashchenko is located 30 km east of Alexeyevka (the district's administrative centre) by road. Vasilchenkov and Berezki are the nearest rural localities.

References 

Rural localities in Alexeyevsky District, Belgorod Oblast
Biryuchensky Uyezd